The Rotgratspitze (3,237 metres) is a mountain in the Stubai Alps, close to the Lisenser Fernerkogel.

Routes 

From the Franz Senn Hütte hut it is approximately 3 hours mostly over glaciers and snow. The West summit is marginally higher and fairly easy. The East would be a bit dodgy to solo.

See also 

 Panorama including Rotgrat from Lisenser Spitze

Mountains of Austria
Mountains of the Alps

References